PlatEAU is an electronic music project featuring cEvin Key and Phil Western. The project resembles a very loose approach to the Download project featuring the same members. The song names and album titles refer to the coffeeshop culture of Amsterdam in The Netherlands implying a "trip" through their musical voyages. The album art also reflects this concept with imagery on their first release on Hypnotic Records in 1997, Music for Grass Bars. This release had a special CD jewel case in order to create a holographic-motion effect with the cover art insert. The genre is most closely related to IDM, experimental, techno and trip hop.

Discography
1997: Music for Grass Bars
1999: Spacecake – #24 CMJ RPM Charts
2002: Iceolator
2007: Kushbush
2009: Gort Spacebar

External links
 PlatEAU's Official Site
 Metropolis Records

References

Canadian electronic music groups
Musical groups from Vancouver
Musical groups established in 1996
Musical groups disestablished in 2003
Musical groups reestablished in 2006
Skinny Puppy
Canadian industrial music groups
Metropolis Records artists
1996 establishments in British Columbia